Joseph Salvatore Chetti is a former American football running back who played one season for the Buffalo Bills in 1987. He was a replacement player.

References

1957 births
Living people
American football running backs
Buffalo Bills players
Players of American football from New York (state)
People from Bay Shore, New York
LIU Post Pioneers football players
National Football League replacement players